Megadictyna is a genus of spiders in the family Megadictynidae. It was first described in 1906 by Friedrich Dahl. , it contains only one species, Megadictyna thilenii, found in New Zealand. Similar to many RTA clade spiders, Megadictyna build wheel-shaped orb webs.

References

Monotypic Araneomorphae genera
Spiders of New Zealand
Megadictynidae
Taxa named by Friedrich Dahl